Hilda Augusta Adelaide Sandels (1830-1921) was a Swedish opera singer.

Sandels was born to colonel lieutenant Lars Sandels. She was the student of Julius Günther and continued her studies in Leipzig. She performed in Berlin, Stockholm, Oslo and Copenhagen. She married custom official Jakob Björklund in 1857.

References 
 Anteckningar om svenska qvinnor
 Det Borgerliga Musikalivet i Göteborg 1850-1880

1830 births
1921 deaths
19th-century Swedish women opera singers

Hilda